Sylvain Chauveau (born 1971) is an instrumental music and electronic music artist and composer from Bayonne, France.

Background
Sylvain Chauveau was born in Bayonne, France (1971), and currently lives in Brussels, Belgium. He is a composer of minimalist music for acoustic instruments and electronics since 1998.

He plays live worldwide.

He has released solo records on Sub Rosa, Fat Cat, Flau, Creative Sources, Nature Bliss, and Les Disques du Soleil et de l'Acier.

He has composed soundtracks for feature films, dance shows, and creates sound installations.

Sylvain Chauveau is also a member of Ensemble 0 (with Stéphane Garin, Joël Merah and many more), of avant-rock band Arca (with Joan Cambon).

Solo discography

Albums
"Le Livre noir du capitalisme" (Noise Museum, 2000, re-issue as "The Black Book of Capitalism", Type, 2008)
"Nocturne impalpable" (DSA, 2001, re-issue Minority Records, 2014)
"Un Autre Décembre" (130701/Fat Cat, re-issue Minority Records, 2015)
"Des Plumes dans la tête" (DSA, 2004), original soundtrack (out of print)
"Down to the bone" (DSA, 2005, re-issue Nature Bliss, 2007, re-issue Ici d'Ailleurs, 2015)
"S." (Type, 2007)
"Nuage (album)" (Type, 2007), original soundtrack
"Touching Down Lightly" (Creative Sources, 2009)
"Singular Forms (Sometimes Repeated)" (Type, 2010)
"Abstractions" (Flau, 2012)
"Simple (Rare and unreleased pieces 1998-2010)" (FatCat, 2012)
"Kogetsudai" (2013)
"How To Live In Small Spaces" (2015)
"Post-Everything" (2017)
"Pianisme" (Sub Rosa, 2019)
"Life Without Machines" (Flau, 2020)
"L'effet rebond" (Sub Rosa, 2022)

Collaborations
ensemble 0 (Stéphane Garin / Sylvain Chauveau / Joël Merah and more)
Arca (Joan Cambon / Sylvain Chauveau)

References
Fat Cat Records

External links

French electronic musicians
1971 births
Living people